The Church of Jesús is a Baroque-style, Roman Catholic church located in the Piazza San Agustin in the city of Murcia, in the Region of Murcia in Spain. The church housed the Confraternity titled Real y Muy Ilustre Cofradía de Nuestro Padre Jesús Nazareno. It still houses the venerated and elaborate processional wood statues of Francisco Salzillo, depicting the Passion of Christ, paraded during Holy Week. The interior has paintings (1792) by Pablo Sístori. It is now part of the Museo Salzillo.

Construction of the octagonal church was begun in 1670, but only completed at the end of the century.

References 

Roman Catholic churches in Murcia
Baroque architecture in Murcia
17th-century Roman Catholic church buildings in Spain